John Sayers Redditt (April 4, 1899 — April 13, 1973) was a Texas politician and businessman. He served in the Texas Senate for District 3, and was a member of the Democratic Party.

Personal life and business career
John Sayers Redditt was born on April 4, 1899 in Center, Texas to John David and Lewis Permellia Redditt, his great-uncle is Joseph Draper Sayers. In 1921, Redditt graduated from University of Texas Law School, and opened a law practice in Lufkin, Texas. On December 27, 1928, Redditt married Hazel Lee Spears, they had 2 daughters together. He served in the United States Army  during World War II. In 1947, Redditt founded Winn's Variety Stores located in San Antonio, Texas. Redditt died on April 13, 1973 in Lufkin, Texas.

Political career
Redditt represented District 3 in the Texas Senate during the 43rd, 44th, 45th, and 46th Legislatures. He was also President pro tempore of the Texas Senate during part of the 44th legislature. Redditt served numerous state offices during his political career. He served as chairman of the Texas Economy Commission and chairman of the Texas Highway Commission. Between 1961 and 1964, he was a regent of the University of Texas. He was also a commission member on the Texas Commission on Higher Education. Furthermore, he served as president of the Texas Good Roads Association. Redditt throughout his political career was affiliated with the Democratic Party.

References

1899 births
1973 deaths
People from Center, Texas
University of Texas alumni
20th-century American politicians
Democratic Party Texas state senators